The Society of Mineral Museum Professionals is a Tucson, Arizona-based professional organization of current and retired staff of accredited museums and universities in the curation of mineralogical, gemological and petrological collections.

The organization has produced monthly newsletters for its members since 1994.

References

External links
 

Mineralogy museums
Natural Science Collections Alliance members